Rebecca Traister (born 1975) is an American author and journalist. Traister is a writer-at-large for New York magazine and its website The Cut, and a contributing editor at Elle magazine. Traister wrote for The New Republic from February 2014 through June 2015. Traister regularly appears on cable TV news, commenting on feminism and politics.

Early life and education
Born in 1975 to a Jewish father and Baptist mother, Traister was raised on a farm. She attended Germantown Friends School in Philadelphia and Northwestern University. After college, she moved to New York City.

Writing and awards
Traister has written about women in politics, media, and entertainment from a feminist perspective for The New Republic and Salon and has also contributed to The Nation, The New York Observer, The New York Times and The Washington Post.  

Traister's first book, the non-fiction Big Girls Don't Cry: The Election that Changed Everything for American Women (2010), was a New York Times Notable Book of 2010, and the winner of the Ernesta Drinker Ballard Book Prize in 2012. One of the key arguments in the book is that 2008 was the year, "in which what was once called the women's liberation movement found thrilling new life" because of the presidential campaign of Hillary Clinton. 

Traister's second non-fiction book, All the Single Ladies: Unmarried Women and the Rise of an Independent Nation (2016), a New York Times best-seller, has been referred to as a followup to the first. Gillian Whitemarch of The New York Times described it as a "well-researched, deeply informative examination of women’s bids for independence, spanning centuries." In 2018, Traister published her third non-fiction book, Good and Mad: The Revolutionary Power of Women's Anger, another New York Times best-seller,

Awards and recognition
Traister received a "Making Trouble / Making History Award" from the Jewish Women's Archive in 2012 at its annual luncheon. Longtime activist Gloria Steinem was the presenter.

In 2012, Traister received a Mirror Award for Best Commentary in Digital Media for two essays that appeared in Salon ("'30 Rock' Takes on Feminist Hypocrisy–and Its Own," and "Seeing 'Bridesmaids' is a Social Responsibility"), and one that was published in The New York Times ("The Soap Opera Is Dead! Long Live The Soap Opera!").

Personal life
In 2011, Traister married Darius Wadia, a public defender in Brooklyn. The couple lives in New York, with their two daughters.

Works

References

Further reading

External links
 
 
 Michael More interviews Rebecca Traister, Ep. 204: Rebecca Traister, Part 2 -- #MeToo, Harvey & Sexual Harassment In Our Left Media | Rumble

1975 births
Living people
21st-century American journalists
21st-century American women writers
American people of Jewish descent
American political journalists
American journalists
American women journalists
Elle (magazine) writers
New York (magazine) people
Northwestern University alumni
The New Republic people
Germantown Friends School alumni
American feminist writers